The Metal Mass – Live is the second video album by German power metal band Powerwolf. The album contains live footage of three shows: Masters of Rock 2015, Summer Breeze 2015, Oberhausen Turbinenhalle, music videos to "Amen & Attack", "Army of the Night", "We Drink Your Blood" and "Sanctified with Dynamite", a festival documentation "A Day at Summer Breeze" and a tour documentation movie "Kreuzweg – Of Wolves and Men".

The album was announced on 30 May 2016.

Track listing

Personnel 
 Attila Dorn – vocals
 Matthew Greywolf – lead guitar
 Charles Greywolf – rhythm guitar
 Roel van Helden – percussion
 Falk Maria Schlegel – keyboards

Charts

DVD

CD

Release history

References 

Powerwolf live albums
2016 video albums
Live video albums